West San Jose is the western region of San Jose, California. The area of West San Jose is bounded on the north by the city of Santa Clara, on the east by San Tomas Expressway, on the south by Prospect Road, and on the west by De Anza Boulevard. The eastern boundary of San Jose City Council District 1 is at State Route 17.

Attractions in West San Jose include the historic Winchester Mystery House, a California historic landmark, as well as over 20 movie theaters, such as AMC Saratoga 14, and Santana Row's Ciné Arts.

History
Most of the housing was built in the 1950s as moderately priced housing. In the last several decades, the area became upscale as the median housing value rose to about two million dollars, especially in the western portion of West San Jose bordering Cupertino and Saratoga.  Nearby commercial/retail includes Santana Row, the Westgate Mall (San Jose), and El Paseo de Saratoga.

Geography
The major thoroughfare of the area is Stevens Creek Boulevard, a premier shopping street.

Education
The eastern portion of West San Jose is served by the Elementary and Middle Public Schools at the Moreland School District, including multiple California Distinguished Schools.   The western portion of the neighborhood is served by the Cupertino Union School District and the Fremont Union High School District.

High schools include:
Archbishop Mitty High School
Harker School, a private college preparatory school
Lynbrook High School
Prospect High School

Landmarks
Le Papillon, an expensive French restaurant
Westfield Valley Fair, a shopping mall
Westgate Mall

External links 
 Map of West San Jose, California
City of San Jose, Council District 1
All About West San Jose
Calabazas branch of the San Jose Public Library system
West Valley branch of the San Jose Public Library system

References

Neighborhoods in San Jose, California